FC Shakhta Raspadskaya Mezhdurechensk is a Russian football team from Mezhdurechensk. It played professionally in 1969 and from 1995 to 1998. Their best result was 9th place in the Zone 6/RSFSR of the Soviet Second League in 1969.

Team name history
 1969 FC Motor Mezhdurechensk
 1994 FC Shakhtyor Mezhdurechensk
 1995–1998 FC Mezhdurechensk
 2001–present FC Shakhta Raspadskaya Mezhdurechensk

External links
  Team history at KLISF

Association football clubs established in 1969
Football clubs in Russia
Sport in Kemerovo Oblast
1969 establishments in Russia